Hristina Joshevska (born 27 December 2000) is a Macedonian footballer who plays as a defender for 1. liga club Kamenica Sasa and the North Macedonia women's national team.

Club career
Joshevska has played for Kamenica Sasa in North Macedonia at the UEFA Women's Champions League.

International career
Joshevska capped for North Macedonia at senior level during the UEFA Women's Euro 2022 qualifying.

References

2000 births
Living people
Macedonian women's footballers
Women's association football defenders
North Macedonia women's international footballers
ŽFK Kamenica Sasa players